James George Stavridis (born February 15, 1955) is a retired United States Navy admiral, currently vice chair, global affairs and managing director of the global investment firm the Carlyle Group, and Chair of the Board of Trustees of the Rockefeller Foundation. Stavridis serves as the chief international diplomacy and national security analyst for NBC News in New York. He is also chair emeritus of the board of directors of the United States Naval Institute and a senior fellow at the Johns Hopkins University Applied Physics Laboratory. He is an associate fellow of the Geneva Centre for Security Policy and a member of the Inter-American Dialogue.

Stavridis graduated from the United States Naval Academy in 1976. While in the Navy, Stavridis served as the commander, United States Southern Command (2006 to 2009) and commander, United States European Command and NATO Supreme Allied Commander Europe (2009 to 2013), the first Navy officer to have held these positions. Stavridis earned a PhD and Master of Arts in Law and Diplomacy from The Fletcher School of Law and Diplomacy at Tufts University in 1984, where he won the Gullion Prize.

Stavridis retired from the Navy in 2013 after thirty-seven years of service and became the dean of the Fletcher School of Law and Diplomacy at Tufts University, a graduate school for international affairs. He stepped down in August 2018.

Stavridis was considered as a potential vice-presidential running mate by the Hillary Clinton campaign in 2016 and as a possible Secretary of State by President-elect Donald Trump in the fall of 2016.

Stavridis is also a bestselling author. His book The Accidental Admiral, describing his time in the Navy, was published in October 2014. The Leader's Bookshelf, published in 2017, describes the top 50 books that, according to Stavridis, inspire better leadership. A second book published in 2017 called Sea Power: The History and Geopolitics of the World's Oceans opened at No. 9 on The Washington Post non-fiction bestseller list. His book Sailing True North: Ten Admirals and the Voyage of Character was published by Penguin Random House on October 15, 2019. His novel 2034: A Novel of the Next World War, co-written with Elliot Ackerman and published in March 2021, debuted at No. 6 on The New York Times Best Seller list. His book "The Sailor's Bookshelf: Fifty Books to Know the Sea" was published in November 2021 and "To Risk It All: Nine Conflicts and the Crucible of Decision" was published in May 2022. His books have been published in twenty different languages.

Early life and family
Stavridis was born in West Palm Beach, Florida, son of Shirley Anne (Schaffer) and Paul George Stavridis. His father was a United States Marine Corps colonel who served in World War II, the Korean War, and the Vietnam War. Stavridis is married to Laura Hall, author of Navy Spouses Guide. His paternal grandparents were Anatolian Greeks, born and raised in Western Anatolia, who emigrated to the United States. His mother's family was Pennsylvania Dutch (German).

In his 2008 book, Destroyer Captain: Lessons of a First Command, Stavridis wrote:

 
A NATO exercise off the coast of modern Turkey was the "most amazing historical irony [he] could imagine," and prompted Stavridis to write of his grandfather: "His grandson, who speaks barely a few words of Greek, returns in command of a billion-dollar destroyer to the very city—Smyrna, now called İzmir—from which he sailed in a refugee craft all those years ago."

Naval career

Stavridis is a 1976 distinguished graduate of the United States Naval Academy. He is a career surface warfare officer and served at sea in aircraft carriers, cruisers, and destroyers. After serving with distinction as Operations Officer on the newly commissioned , Stavridis commanded destroyer  from 1993 to 1995, completing deployments to Haiti, Bosnia, and the Persian Gulf. Barry won the Battenberg Cup as the top ship in the Atlantic Fleet under his command. In 1998, he commanded Destroyer Squadron 21 and deployed to the Persian Gulf in 1998, winning the Navy League's John Paul Jones Award for Inspirational Leadership.

From 2002 to 2004, Stavridis commanded Enterprise Carrier Strike Group, conducting combat operations in the Persian Gulf in support of both Operation Iraqi Freedom and Operation Enduring Freedom. Afterwards, as a vice admiral, Stavridis served as senior military assistant to the United States Secretary of Defense. On October 19, 2006, he became the first Navy officer to command the United States Southern Command in Miami, Florida. In July 2009, he became the 16th Supreme Allied Commander Europe (SACEUR).  He retired as SACEUR in 2013.

Ashore, Stavridis served as a strategic and long range planner on the staffs of the Chief of Naval Operations and the Chairman of the Joint Chiefs of Staff. At the start of the "Global War on Terror", he was selected as the director of the Navy Operations Group, Deep Blue, USA. He has also served as the executive assistant to the Secretary of the Navy and the senior military assistant to the United States Secretary of Defense.  He was promoted directly from 1-star rank to 3-star rank in 2004.

Stavridis has long advocated the use of "smart power," which he defines as the balance of hard and soft power taken together. In numerous articles and speeches, he has advocated creating security in the 21st century by building bridges, not walls. Stavridis has stressed the need to connect international, inter-agency, and public-private actors to build security, lining all of them with effective strategic communications. His message was articulated in his book "Partnership for the Americas", which was published by the NDU Press and was based on his time as Commander of the U.S. Southern Command from 2006–2009. The book was summarized in his 2012 Ted Global talk in Scotland, which has been viewed more than 700,000 times online.

Based on an anonymous complaint, in early 2011 the Department of Defense Inspector General began investigating allegations that Stavridis "engaged in misconduct relating to official and unofficial travel and other matters." He was subsequently the subject of a May 3, 2012, report by the Inspector General, and was later absolved of wrongdoing by the Secretary of the Navy on September 11, 2012. In a Memorandum for the Record, Secretary of the Navy Ray Mabus wrote that Stavridis "has consistently demonstrated himself to be a model naval officer and a devoted public servant whose motivation is to do that which is necessary and appropriate to advance the interests of the United States." Mabus concluded that "I have determined that ADM Stavridis never attempted to use his public office for private gain nor did he commit personal misconduct."

Stavridis earned a Master of Arts in Law and Diplomacy in 1983, and a PhD in International Relations in 1984, from The Fletcher School of Law and Diplomacy at Tufts University, where he won the Gullion Prize as outstanding student. Stavridis is also 1992 distinguished graduate of the United States National War College.

Harvard University published a case study on Admiral Stavridis' leadership called "Hearts and Minds: Admiral Jim Stavridis on the Art of Wrangling NATO": https://case.hks.harvard.edu/hearts-and-minds-admiral-jim-stavridis-on-the-art-of-wrangling-nato/

Dean of the Fletcher School
Stavridis was appointed dean of the Fletcher School of Law and Diplomacy at Tufts University on July 1, 2013.

As dean, Stavridis initiated a strategic planning process, invited several high level speakers to the campus, and is focusing thematically on the Arctic, the role of women in international relations, synthetic biology and its impact on foreign affairs, cyber, and the role of online media and social networks in public diplomacy.

Media and public speaking

Since leaving active duty, Stavridis has frequently appeared on major broadcast and cable television networks to comment on national security and foreign policy matters. He has frequently appeared on news networks like CNN, Fox News, BBC and Bloomberg, and chief international diplomacy and national security analyst for NBC News and MSNBC. He is a Bloomberg Opinion columnist and has written hundreds of articles in many diverse publications including Time, Nikkei Asian Review, Foreign Policy, Huffington World Post, and Proceedings, the magazine of the U.S. Naval Institute. Many of his media appearances and writings are linked from the news page of his website.

Tufts University had a remote television studio installed on the campus of The Fletcher School so that Stavridis and other faculty and administrators could easily make themselves available to the international media. In August 2016 NBC News named Stavridis as their "chief international security and diplomacy analyst."  Also in August 2016, according to Stavridis' official Twitter account, he began a monthly column for Time.com. The first column was about a "grand bargain" with Russia.

Stavridis has also been a public speaker – among his many appearances are multiple appearances at the World Economic Forum in Davos, Switzerland, the Munich Security Conference in 2013, and lectures at Harvard, Yale, Georgetown, The University of Texas at Arlington, and many other universities. He has delivered the "Forrestal Lecture," a major address to the brigade of midshipmen at the U.S. Naval Academy on four occasions.

In July 2022 he was writer-in-residence at Hemingway House in Ketchum, Idaho  and was a featured speaker at the Sun Valley Writer's Conference in 2022  and 2021.

In November 2022 he was sanctioned by the Kremlin for his outspoken criticism of the Putin regime.

Board and organization membership
Stavridis is on the board of several corporations and charitable organizations. In May 2021 he was named  Chair of the Board of Trustees of the Rockefeller Foundation on which he had served since 2017. Among the other boards he serves on are PreVeil, a cybersecurity company that develops encrypted email and file sharing systems for business and individual use, the American Water Works Company, a water and wastewater utility company, Michael Baker International, an engineering, planning and consulting company, the Neuberger Berman Funds, and the Onassis Foundation.  He is also a member of the Council on Foreign Relations and the American Academy of Arts and Sciences. In 2021, Stavridis joined Shield Capital's board of Strategic Advisors

Commencement speeches and honorary degrees
Stavridis has given numerous commencement and graduation addresses around the country at universities such as the United States Merchant Marine Academy in 2008, the University of Miami in 2011, Dickinson College in 2017, and California State Maritime Norwich University in 2018, Metropolitan State University of Denver in 2019,   and Sewanee, The University of the South, in 2021, and The Citadel in 2022. He received an honorary Doctor of Public Service degree from Tufts University in 2022.

Consideration for political office
On July 12, 2016, The New York Times and other media organizations reported that Stavridis was being vetted by the Hillary Clinton presidential campaign as a possible vice presidential running mate on the Democratic ticket. The Washington Post summarized Stavridis' qualifications in a short video. Publications like the Navy Times cited his NATO leadership as pluses. An article in Politico called him "Hillary's Anti-Trump." Stavridis was quoted in that article as joking: "My name is too long for a bumper sticker." Eventually, Clinton selected Tim Kaine.

On December 8, 2016, Stavridis went to Trump Tower in New York City to meet with President-elect Donald Trump. Following the meeting, Stavridis told reporters that they had discussed world events, cybersecurity and other matters. Press accounts suggested he was under consideration for Secretary of State or Director of National Intelligence. On December 14, 2016, however, in an interview on MSNBC's Morning Joe, Stavridis said that he would not be taking a position in the Trump administration.

Awards and decorations

U.S. military decorations
Stavridis has received the following awards and decorations of the United States military.

 Surface Warfare Officer badge

International decorations

Other awards and honors
Stavridis has received an array of other awards and honors, including the following (listed by date conferred):

 The U.S. Naval Institute Proceedings Author of the Year (1995).
 The Distinguished Graduate Leadership Award of the Naval War College, given annually to a graduate of the college who has "attained positions of prominence in the field of national security" (2003).
 The Naval Institute Press Author of the Year (2010).
 The Intrepid Sea, Air & Space Museum's Intrepid Freedom Award, "presented to a national or international leader who has distinguished himself in promoting and defending the values of freedom and democracy" (2011).
 The AFCEA's David Sarnoff Award, the group's highest honor, given "to recognize individuals who have made lasting and significant contributions to global peace" (2011).
 The Archons of the Ecumenical Patriarchate Order of St. Andrew the Apostle's Athenagoras Human Rights Award, accepted on behalf of the U.S. armed forces (2011).
Honoree, Federal Computer Week "Federal 100" (2011).
 The Navy League of the United States's Alfred Thayer Mahan Award for Literary Achievement (2011).
 The Jewish Institute for National Security Affairs (JINSA) Henry M. Jackson Distinguished Service Award, given "in recognition of his service to the defense of the United States and our European allies, and for strengthening security cooperation with Israel" (2011).
 The Atlantic Council's Distinguished Military Leadership Award (2011)
 The Business Executives for National Security's Eisenhower Award (2012).
 The Chian Federation's 33rd Annual Homeric Award (2012)
 The first recipient of the Distinguished Ally of the Israel Defense Forces Award presented by IDF Chief of Staff General Benny Gantz April 11, 2013.
 Stimson Center Pragmatist + Idealist Award, for work "to strengthen international security by helping countries in the developing world improve the lives of their people" (2013).
 The Alpha Omega Council's Lifetime Achievement Award, given to a distinguished Greek American citizen (2015)
 The Naval Order of the United States's Distinguished Sea Service Award, for "professional leadership and support to the Sea Services of the United States of America" (2015).
 The Truce Foundation of the USA awarded him their inaugural "Building Bridges Award" at the 2016 Rio Olympic Games.
 The Washington Institute 2016 Scholar-Statesman Award
 Institute for Global Leadership at Tufts University Dr. Jean Mayer Global Citizenship Award, 2017
 Ellis Island Medal of Honor Recipient 2017
 The American Veterans Center 2017 Andrew Goodpaster Prize
 Society for International Development Award for Leadership in Development, December 8, 2017
 Leadership 100 Conference "Archbishop Iakovos Leadership 100 Award for Excellence," February 3, 2018
Theodore Roosevelt Association "Medal of Honor Awardee" October 26, 2019
International Churchill Society "Winston S. Churchill Leadership Award" October 30, 2019
Grand Cross of Colombia, August 3, 2022
Selected as a 2023 United States Naval Academy Distinguished Graduate by the U.S. Naval Academy Alumni Association and Foundation

Published works
Selected books

To Risk It All: Nine Conflicts and the Crucible of Decision, Penguin Press, 2022, 
The Sailor's Bookshelf: Fifty Books to Know the Sea, U.S. Naval Institute Press, 2021  ISBN 978-1682476987
With Elliot Ackerman 2034: A Novel of the Next World War. Penguin Press, 2021. 
 Sailing True North: Ten Admirals and the Voyage of Character, Penguin Press, October 15, 2019, 
Sea Power: The History and Geopolitics of the World's Oceans, Penguin Press, June 6, 2017, 
 The Leader's Bookshelf, U.S. Naval Institute Press, 2017, 
 The Accidental Admiral: A Sailor Takes Command at NATO, U.S. Naval Institute Press, 2014  
 Partnership for the Americas: Western Hemisphere Strategy and U.S. Southern Command, NDU Press, November 2010 
 Command At Sea, Sixth Edition, Annapolis: U.S. Naval Institute Press, Co-authored with Rear Admiral Robert Girrier, USN, 2010 
 Destroyer Captain: Lessons of a First Command, U.S. Naval Institute Press, 2007 
 Watch Officer's Guide, Twelfth Edition, Annapolis: U.S. Naval Institute Press, Co-authored with Captain Robert Girrier, 2006 
 Division Officer's Guide, Eleventh Edition, Annapolis: U.S. Naval Institute Press, Co-authored with Commander Robert Girrier, 2005

In popular culture
In 2020, character traits developed by Stavridis were used as the basis for a business fable by Amy S. Hamilton, called The Consummate Communicator: Character Traits of True Professionals, which provides a guide for how to interact in the workplace. In it, Jay Admiral, a character based on Stavridis, shares fundamental behaviors that improve working environments. Stavridis wrote the foreword for the book.

References

External links

 Personal website
 Stavridis bio at Carlyle Group
 2034: A Novel of the Next World War at Google Books

 An extensive and relevant analysis of the role played by Stavridis in the Mediterranean and in the militarization of the so-called "migrant crisis" in the documentary review OJALA/SanchoPanzaLab n.6 (Paris, January 2017) (in Spanish)* U.S. Smart Power: Interview with Adm. Stavridis. Bjoern H. Seibert, Fletcher Forum of World Affairs, Summer 2008 Vol 32:2.
 Interview with Adm. Stavridis. Col David H. Gurney, USMC, Joint Force Quarterly, Issue 50, 3d Quarter 2008
 EUCOM blog
 Stavridis gives testimony regarding Libya crisis, March 28, 2011 – see 4.39pm
 2017 Commencement Speech at Dickinson College

|-

|-

|-

1955 births
American people of Greek descent
Eastern Orthodox Christians from the United States
Living people
NATO Supreme Allied Commanders
National War College alumni
Naval War College alumni
People from West Palm Beach, Florida
Recipients of the Defense Distinguished Service Medal
Recipients of the Defense Superior Service Medal
Recipients of the Legion of Merit
Recipients of the Order of Naval Merit (Brazil)
The Fletcher School at Tufts University faculty
United States Naval Academy alumni
United States Navy admirals
Knights Commander of the Order of Merit of the Federal Republic of Germany
Raytheon Company people
NBC News people
MSNBC people
The Washington Institute for Near East Policy
Recipients of the Navy Distinguished Service Medal
Members of the Inter-American Dialogue